Presidential elections were held in Chile on Friday, June 25, 1920. The Liberal Alliance candidate Arturo Alessandri defeated the National Union candidate Luis Barros Borgoño in the last Chilean presidential election to have been decided by an electoral college. The results were a turning point for Chilean history, setting the end of the succession of oligarch and 19th-century governments and the start of a new, modern one run by the middle class.

Incumbent president Juan Luis Sanfuentes was not able to run for a second term, as specified in the 1871 reform of the constitution. Arturo Alessandri and Eliodoro Yáñez, both Liberals, became the favourite candidates for the Liberal Alliance, formed by the half of the Liberal Party, the Radicals, the Democrats, the Doctrinals and others. Alessandri won the 1920 Liberal Alliance primary vote in the second round, defeating Yáñez, Enrique Mac Iver and Armado Quezada (both Radicals).

The National Union, formed by the National, Liberal Democratic and Nationalist parties and the other half of the Liberals, was divided between those who wanted to come closer to the conservatives and those who did not. Luis Barros Borgoño, Enrique Zañartu and Ismael Tocornal were the principal candidates. The first one won the 1920 National Union Convention with the support of the Conservative Party.

The elections were held in a tense and violent political environment, where the social issues, the Legislative power primacy over the Executive and the separation of church and state were at stake. Both candidates proposed similar government plans, with the main difference being Alessandri's fervent campaign, which included passionate speeches from balconies, to rallies with the Chilean middle class. During his campaign, Alessandri spoke against the rule of the oligarchy and advocated for democratic and renovating reforms. On the contrary, Barros Borgoño presented himself as the candidate of tranquillity and seriousness, accusing his opponent of fomenting class hatred. A third candidate, Luis Emilio Recabarren, from the Socialist Workers' Party, also run in the election, still knowing he had little chances of winning, but stating the election to be just an intern conflict between different branches of the oligarchy.

The election results were almost a tie and were heavily disputed by both sides: the two candidates claimed victory. In the following months, political violence arouse in the country, with the population fearing a revolution. As a response to uncertainty and fraud accusations, a Tribunal of Honour was created to perform a detailed examination of the results. This solution was agreed upon by both parties. On September 30, the verdict was given, giving 177 electoral votes to Alessandri and 176 to Barros Borgoño. The first was declared the winner of the election, and the results modified by the Tribunal were accepted by the Congress in October.

Nominations

Liberal Alliance nomination 

Liberal Alliance candidates:

National Union nomination

Socialist Workers' Party

Results

References

Presidential elections in Chile
1920 in Chile
Chile
June 1920 events